VA-195 or VA 195 may refer to:

 Strike Fighter Squadron 195, a unit of the United States Navy
 State Route 195 (Virginia), a  road in the Commonwealth of Virginia